This is a list of Finnish government owned companies:

Wholly owned 
Alko
OHY Arsenal 
CSC - Tieteellinen laskenta
Destia
Finavia
Finnvera
Hansel Ltd.
Motiva
 
Patria
Rahapaja (Mint of Finland)
Solidium
 
Posti Group
 
Suomen Vientiluotto
 
VR Group

Shared majority ownership 
 
Finnair
Fortum
Gasum
 
 
Neste Oil
Raskone
 Finnfund
  (a joint venture with Tieto)
 Neova
Veikkaus
Finnish Broadcasting Company

Shared minority ownership 
Altia
Ekokem
Engel Yhtymä
Fingrid
Gasum
Licentia
Santapark
Silta
Suomen Siemenperunakeskus
Vuotekno
Companies in state-owned investment company Solidium's portfolio:
Elisa
Kemira
Outokumpu
Outotec
Rautaruukki
Sampo
Stora Enso
Talvivaara
TeliaSonera
Tieto

Commercial Government Agencies
Metsähallitus (Forest and Park Service)
Senate Properties

Defunct
VPU Pukutehdas

See also

 Government of Finland
 List of Finnish companies
 List of government-owned companies
 Economy of Finland

References

Government enterprises
Government enterprises, Finland
 
Finland